Matthew "Matt" Harrigan is an American television writer, producer, and voice actor who is best known for his work on shows like the Late Show with David Letterman and Celebrity Deathmatch. He was also the television host of FishCenter Live.

Career
Harrigan has worked as a producer on several shows for Williams Street and was the founder of the short lived studio Williams Street West. He was the Adult Swim creative director. He also wrote numerous episodes of the series, Space Ghost Coast to Coast (including the entirety of the eighth season).

Harrigan's animated television series Assy McGee premiered in November 2006. In addition, he performed the voice of the regular character, Liquor, in 12 oz. Mouse, the Major Shake Replicant in two episodes of Aqua Teen Hunger Force and the voice of Linda in the Aqua Teen Hunger Force Colon Movie Film for Theaters. He is the creator of FishCenter Live and hosted it alongside Dave Bonawits, Andrew Choe, Christina Loranger, and Max Simonet from 2014 to 2020, and, as the VP of Digital Content for the network, led the development of the Adult Swim Streams, a free live stream consisting of several online-exclusive originals, of which FishCenter Live was the flagship program. Harrigan was one of many Adult Swim employees to be laid off in November 2020, a move that led to the discontinuation of the Adult Swim Streams.

Filmography

Television

Film

Video games

See also
List of talk show hosts

References

External links

American male voice actors
American television producers
American television talk show hosts
American television writers
Living people
American male television writers
Place of birth missing (living people)
Year of birth missing (living people)